Bibasis vasutana, the green awlet, is a species of hesperid butterfly found in Asia.  The butterfly was reassigned to genus Burara by Vane-Wright and de Jong (2003) and is considered by them to be Burara vasutana.

Range
The green awlet is found in Nepal, the Indian Himalayas, Myanmar, Thailand and Laos.

In India, the butterfly ranges from Kumaon, across Nepal along the Himalayas to Sikkim and Assam and eastwards towards Myanmar.

The type locality is Darjeeling in northern West Bengal.

Status
William Harry Evans described it is being not rare in the Himalayas.

Description
.

The butterfly has a wingspan of 55 to 65 mm.

Edward Yerbury Watson (1891) gives a detailed description:

Habits
This butterfly is crepuscular.

Cited references

See also

Coeliadinae
Hesperiidae
List of butterflies of India (Coeliadinae)
List of butterflies of India (Hesperiidae)

References

Print

Watson, E. Y. (1891) Hesperiidae indicae. Vest and Co. Madras.

Online
 
Brower, Andrew V. Z. and Warren, Andrew, (2007). Coeliadinae Evans 1937. Version 21 February 2007 (temporary). http://tolweb.org/Coeliadinae/12150/2007.02.21 in The Tree of Life Web Project, http://tolweb.org/

Bibasis
Butterflies of Asia
Butterflies described in 1865
Taxa named by Frederic Moore